Fisk's house snake (Lamprophis fiskii) is a species of snake in the family Lamprophiidae.
It is endemic to South Africa.

References

Lamprophis
Endemic reptiles of South Africa
Reptiles described in 1887
Taxonomy articles created by Polbot